Dicranum scoparium, the broom forkmoss, is a species of dicranid moss, native to most of the northern hemisphere as well as Oceania. It usually forms tufts or mats on soil in dry to moist forested areas. As with many types of moss Broom moss grows in clumps with Broom mosses as well as other mosses. It can be distinguished by its leaves, which strongly curve to one side.

Description
Broom forkmoss is usually robust and coarse, forming shiny tufts with woolly stems 2–8 cm high. The leaf midrib extends to the tip and usually has 4 ridges along its back.  The leaves are 3.5–8 mm long, lance-shaped with a long, slender point, and strongly toothed along the upper third.  Most leaves will be folded and curved to one side, but may be wavy. Capsules are 2.3–5 mm long, urn-shaped and curved. The capsules are held on mostly-erect stalks 18–35 mm long. The operculum (capsule lid) is usually longer than the capsule.

As a bryophyte, Dicranum scoparium has pluricellular rhiziods (root structure) which help with water absorption and anchor the plant to the ground.

Distribution
Broom forkmoss can be found across North America (except Labrador, North Dakota, Texas and Nevada), Europe, Asia, northern Africa as well as in Australia and New Zealand

Gallery

References

Dicranales
Bryophyta of North America
Flora of the Great Lakes region (North America)
Taxa named by Johann Hedwig